On 9 July 2022, a mass shooting took place at a tavern in Orlando, Soweto, Gauteng, South Africa. 16 people were killed in the incident. 

At about 21:00 GMT, a group of men armed with rifles and a 9mm pistol opened fire on patrons in the tavern. A total of 23 people were shot. 12 people were killed at the scene and 3 others later died in the hospital. A fourth injured victim died at the hospital on July 12, bringing the death toll to 16. The perpetrators fled the scene in a white minibus taxi and have not been apprehended. The police arrived at 04:00 GMT on 10 July 2022, and the injured victims were sent to the Chris Hani Baragwanath Hospital.

The shooting occurred on the same day as another mass shooting in a tavern in Pietermaritzburg, KwaZulu-Natal, though authorities do not believe the incidents are linked.

References 

2022 mass shootings in Africa
2022 murders in South Africa
21st-century mass murder in Africa
Attacks on bars
Attacks on buildings and structures in 2022
Attacks on buildings and structures in Africa
Deaths by firearm in South Africa
History of Johannesburg
July 2022 crimes in Africa
Mass murder in 2022
Mass shootings in South Africa
Massacres in South Africa
2022 shooting